The 15th Wing is a wing of the United States Air Force.

15th Wing may also refer to:

 15th Air Transport Wing, a unit of the Belgian Air Force 
 15th Bombardment Training Wing, a unit of the United States Air Force
 15 Wing Moose Jaw, a Canadian Forces base

See also
XV Corps (disambiguation)
15th Army (disambiguation)
15th Division (disambiguation)
15th Group (disambiguation)
15th Brigade (disambiguation)
15th Regiment (disambiguation)
15 Squadron (disambiguation)